Lac des Arcs is a hamlet in Alberta, Canada within the Municipal District (MD) of Bighorn No. 8. Highway 1 (the Trans-Canada Highway) borders Lac des Arcs on the south.

The hamlet is located in Census Division No. 15 and in the federal riding of Wild Rose.

Lake 

The wide span of the Bow River adjacent to the Hamlet of Lac des Arcs is also referred to as a lake under the same name, which attracts wind surfers and fishers.  The Lafarge Exshaw Plant, a limestone quarry, is developed on the lake's northern shore.

Demographics 

See also 
List of communities in Alberta
List of designated places in Alberta
List of hamlets in Alberta

References 

Municipal District of Bighorn No. 8
Hamlets in Alberta
Designated places in Alberta